Lawrence Christopher Jackson (born August 30, 1985) is a former American football defensive end who played in the National Football League (NFL). He was drafted by the Seattle Seahawks in the first round of the 2008 NFL Draft. He played college football at USC.

He is referred to as LJ or LoJack.

High school career
Jackson played football and ran track at Inglewood High School in Inglewood, California. In 2002, Jackson was a consensus prep All-America, All-West, All-State, All-City and All-League selection as well as his league's MVP. He had 142 tackles, with 11 sacks, plus 4 fumble recoveries and 2 interceptions in 2002 while playing defensive line and middle linebacker.

As a junior in 2001, he was All-City and All-League and his league's Defensive Player of the Year. He had 134 tackles, including 22 sacks, plus 2 interceptions (1 returned for a TD), 7 forced fumbles, 3 fumble recoveries and 3 blocked kicks in 2001. Inglewood made it to the 2001 CIF Division X semi-finals. During his 2000 sophomore season, Inglewood advanced to the CIF Division X finals. For his career, he had 57 sacks.

Jackson applied to be the head coach for Inglewood High School in 2014, losing out on the job to his former coach Jason Miller.

College career
Jackson played college football for the University of Southern California and was a 4-year starter for the Trojans starting 51 of 52 games. Philip Rivers (NC State) is the only other player in NCAA history to start 51 games. In 2007 Jackson was an AP All-American second-team selection, Collegefootballnews.com All-American third-team, All-Pac-10 first-team (making it for the second time after being so honored in 2005), ESPN.com All-Pac-10 first-team, Collegefootballnews.com All-Pac-10 first-team, and the Rivals.com All-Pac-10 first-team. Jackson was on the 2007 Street and Smiths and Phil Steele's preseason All-American first-team and on the Ted Hendricks Award and Bednarik Award watch lists.

He was on the 2006 Lombardi Award, Bednarik Award and Bronko Nagurski Trophy watch lists and 2006 Athlon and Street & Smith's Walter Camp preseason All-American. He fell to Second-team Rivals.com and coaches All-Pac-10 in 2006. He totaled only 4 sacks in 2006, off from his first two years at USC.

He led the team with 10 sacks in 2005. He also had 46 tackles. He was a 2005 Rivals.com Third-team All-American. He was First-team All-Pac-10 and on ESPN's First-team All-Pac-10 team.

Jackson started at defensive end as a redshirt freshman in 2004. He played in 13 games (12 starts). He made the 2004 Collegefootballnews.com Freshman All-American first-team, The Sporting News and Rivals.com Freshman All-American second-teams. He had 32 tackles (11 for a loss) and 6 sacks.

Jackson redshirted as a true freshman in 2003. He won USC's Service Team Defensive Player of the Year award. After the season, he had arthroscopic surgery on his right ankle to remove debris.

College career statistics

Key: GP - games played; GS - games started; TT - total tackles; T/L - tackles for a loss; FR - fumbles recovered; PD - passes deflected; Int - interceptions

Professional career

Measurables

Seattle Seahawks

Jackson was selected with the 28th pick in the 2008 NFL draft by the Seattle Seahawks. He was the fourth defensive end taken in the first round (behind Chris Long, Vernon Gholston, and Derrick Harvey).

Jackson had a disappointing 2008 season as he finished with 29 tackles and 2 sacks. However, he did play every game of the season. After the season, Jackson said that he was looking to improve.

Detroit Lions
On August 18, 2010, Jackson was traded to the Detroit Lions for a 6th-round pick in the 2011 NFL Draft.

Jackson finished the 2010 season with 34 tackles and 6 sacks, along with a forced fumble while playing only 11 games as the Lions finished 6-10.

Jackson was not able to replicate the same results in 2011 or 2012, posting a combined 46 tackles and 7 sacks over the two seasons.

NFL statistics

Key
 GP: games played
 COMB: combined tackles
 TOTAL: total tackles
 AST: assisted tackles
 SACK: sacks
 FF: forced fumbles
 FR: fumble recoveries
 FR YDS: fumble return yards 
 INT: interceptions
 IR YDS: interception return yards
 AVG IR: average interception return
 LNG: longest interception return
 TD: interceptions returned for touchdown
 PD: passes defensed

References

External links

USC Bio
Lombardi Award List

1985 births
Living people
American football defensive ends
Players of American football from Inglewood, California
Players of American football from Los Angeles
USC Trojans football players
Seattle Seahawks players
Detroit Lions players
Minnesota Vikings players
Inglewood High School (California) alumni